"Work Hard, Play Hard" is a song by American rapper Wiz Khalifa, released as the lead single from his fourth studio album, O.N.I.F.C. (2012). The track features production from Benny Blanco and Stargate.

Track listing
Digital download
 "Work Hard, Play Hard" - 3:40

Music video
The music video was directed by Bill Paladino and was released on May 23, 2012. It was filmed in Pittsburgh, Pennsylvania at multiple locations, including a ballet studio, the city suburbs, a private party at a bar, and a soccer field. It features a ballerina played by Katie Schurman, a construction worker played by Michael Major and a soccer player working in each of these roles, and later celebrating at the bar. Wiz Khalifa appears wearing clothes as a hippie, paying tribute to Jimi Hendrix. Multiple Taylor Gang members make cameo appearances as well.

Kansas City Chiefs wide receiver Steve Breaston, who graduated from Woodland Hills High School just outside Pittsburgh, also appears in the video.

Remix
The official remix featuring Lil Wayne and Young Jeezy was revealed through his Twitter page on August 25, 2012. Drake was originally supposed to have a verse on the remix but that didn't come to fruition as he never submitted his verse.

Notable mentions
Marco Rubio mentioned the song during March 2013 Rand Paul Filibuster of CIA Director. Rand Paul's filibuster tried to block President Obama's choice of John O. Brennan as CIA chief. Calling Wiz Khalifa a modern poet, Rubio mentioned the rapper by name and stated that he was reminded of his song "Work Hard, Play Hard. "You look at the time, I think it's a time when many of our colleagues expected to be home, back in the home state playing hard," Rubio said, "but I'm happy we're here still working hard on this issue."

Usage in media
The song was featured in a commercial for the beverage Canada Dry in 2017. The song was also featured in the first trailer for The Boss Baby: Family Business.

Charts

Weekly charts

Year-end charts

Certifications

Release history

Credits and personnel
Songwriter –  Cameron Thomaz, Benjamin Levin, Mikkel Storleer Eriksen, Tor Erik Hermansen
Production – Benny Blanco, Stargate

References

2012 singles
Wiz Khalifa songs
Song recordings produced by Benny Blanco
Song recordings produced by Stargate (record producers)
Songs written by Tor Erik Hermansen
Songs written by Mikkel Storleer Eriksen
Songs written by Benny Blanco
Atlantic Records singles
Rostrum Records singles
2012 songs